Titusville is a city in the far eastern corner of Crawford County, Pennsylvania, United States. The population was 5,262 at the 2020 census. Titusville is known as the birthplace of the American oil industry and for a number of years was the leading oil-producing region in the world. It was also notable for its lumber industry, including 17 sawmills, as well as its plastic and toolmaking industries. It is part of the Meadville micropolitan area.

History 

The area was first settled in 1796 by Jonathan Titus. Within 14 years, others bought and improved land lying near his, along the banks of what is now Oil Creek. Titus named the village Edinburg(h), but as it grew, the settlers began to call the hamlet Titusville. The village was incorporated as a borough in 1849. It was a slow-growing community until the 1850s, when petroleum was discovered in the region.

Oil was known to exist there, but there was no practical way to extract it. Its main use at that time had been as a medicine for both animals and humans. In the late 1850s, the Seneca Oil Company (formerly the Pennsylvania Rock Oil Company) sent Col. Edwin L. Drake to start drilling on a piece of leased land just south of Titusville, near what is now Oil Creek State Park. In the summer of 1859, Drake hired a salt well driller, William A. Smith. They had many difficulties, but on August 27, at the site of an oil spring just south of Titusville, they finally drilled a well that could be commercially successful.

Teamsters were needed immediately to transport the oil to markets. In 1862, the Oil Creek & Titusville Railroad was built between Titusville and Corry, where the product was transferred to larger east-west railroad lines. In 1865, pipelines were laid directly to the line and the demand for teamsters practically ended. The next year the railroad line was extended south to Petroleum Centre and Oil City. The Union & Titusville Railroad was built in 1865.  That line became part of the Philadelphia and Erie Railroad in 1871. That fall, President Ulysses S. Grant visited Titusville to view the important region.

Other oil-related businesses were quickly established. Eight refineries were built between 1862 and 1868. Drilling tools were needed and several iron works were built. Titusville grew from 250 residents to 10,000 almost overnight and in 1866, it incorporated as a city. In 1871, the first oil exchange in the United States was established there.  The exchange moved from the city, but returned in 1881 in a new, brick building, before being dissolved in 1897.

The first oil millionaire was Jonathan Watson, a resident of Titusville.  He owned the land where Drake's well was drilled.  He had been a partner in a lumber business prior to the success of the well.  At one time it was said that Titusville had more millionaires per capita than anywhere else in the world.

One resident of note was Franklin S. Tarbell, whose large Italianate home still stands. He first moved a few miles south in Venango County and established a wooden stock tank business. Oil was discovered in a rolling meadow there in January 1865 and, by September 1865, the population was 15,000. But the oil soon ran dry and within four years the city was nearly deserted. Tarbell moved to Titusville in 1870. His daughter, Ida Minerva Tarbell, grew up amidst the sounds and smells of the oil industry. She became an accomplished writer and published a series of articles about the business practices of the Standard Oil Company and its president, John D. Rockefeller, which sparked legislative action in Congress concerning monopolies.

Fire was always a significant concern around oil and one of the worst blazes was on June 11, 1880. It came to be known as "Black Friday", when almost  of oil burned after an oil tank was hit by lightning. The fire raged for three days until it finally was brought under control. The destroyed oil was valued at $2 million, but there was no loss of life. Another fire occurred on June 5, 1892, when Oil Creek flooded and a tank of petroleum ether overturned. The petroleum ether ignited and, in the ensuing explosions, 60 men, women and children died.

Oil production in Pennsylvania peaked in 1891, after which other industries became established in Titusville. The iron and steel industries dominated the town in the early twentieth century, with lumber eventually reclaiming its former pre-eminence. Oil still has some relevance, however. Charter Plastics, now located in a building that once manufactured pressure vessels, stationary engines and boilers for the oil industry, uses oil in its production processes.

Geography
Titusville is located at  (41.629, −79.674).

Located 44.4 miles south of Erie, Pennsylvania

83.6 miles North of Pittsburgh, Pennsylvania 

122.9 Miles East of Cleveland, Ohio

120.5 Miles South of Buffalo, New York

78.2 Miles North East of Youngstown, Ohio

Climate

Natural features
The City of Titusville is located in the southeastern Corner of Crawford County in the Pittsburgh High Plateau. The city is drained by Oil Creek, a south-flowing tributary of the Allegheny River, and two tributaries to Oil Creek, Pine Creek, and Church Run. The lowest elevation in the City of Titusville is  where Oil Creek flows south of out of the city.

Demographics

As of the 2017 United States Census, there were 5,418 people, 2,397 households, and 1,337 families residing in the city. The racial makeup of the city was 96.2% White, 1.9% African American, 0.2% Native American, 0.9% Asian, 0.2% from other races, and 1.1% from two or more races. Hispanic or Latino of any race were 1.2% of the population.

There were 2,322 households, out of which 25.4% had children under the age of 18 living with them, 39.2% were married couples living together, 13.9% had a female householder with no husband present, and 42.4% were non-families. 37.4% of all households were made up of individuals, and 19.3% had someone living alone who was 65 years of age or older. The average household size was 2.23 and the average family size was 2.91.

In the city, the population was spread out, with 22.8% under the age of 18, 11.7% from 18 to 24, 22.2% from 25 to 44, 24.5% from 45 to 64, and 19.9% who were 65 years of age or older. The median age was 40.1 years. For every 100 females, there were 84.8 males. For every 100 females age 18 and over, there were 79.0 males.

The median income for a household in the city was $28,978 and the median income for a family was $39,679. Males had a median income of $27,283 versus $20,458 for females. The per capita income for the city was $19,915. About 13.0% of families and 15.9% of the population were below the poverty line, including 17.4% of those under age 18 and 6.7% of those age 65 or over.

Transportation 

 Crawford Area Transportation Authority
 Titusville Regional Airport

Historical markers 

 Titusville Early Refinery
 Edwin L Drake Tombstone
 The John Heisman Memorial
 Oil Creek State Park
 Titusville Oil Exchange

Tourism 

The Drake Well Museum and Park- A museum that interprets the birth of the American oil industry in 1859 by "Colonel" Edwin Drake along the banks of Oil Creek in Cherrytree Township, Venango County, Pennsylvania in the United States. The museum collects and preserves related artifacts. The reconstructed Drake Well demonstrates the first practical use of salt drilling techniques for the extraction of petroleum through an oil well. A historic site, the museum is located in Cherrytree Township, 2 miles (4.8 km) south of Titusville on Drake Well Road, situated between Pennsylvania Routes 8 and 27. The museum is accredited by the American Alliance of Museums.
Tarbell House
Pithole Museum & Visitor Center- Legendary boomtown that was destroyed by a fire
South Franklin Street Bridge- The Historical Steel Bridge located in the Heart of Titusville
Benson Memorial Library- A historic Victorian style building
Oil Creek and Titusville Railroad is a tourist railroad that runs from Titusville to Rynd Farm north of Oil City. 
Titusville Historical Society & Heritage Center
Titusville City Hall-  National Historic Site 
Great Eastern Cutlery- Knife Factory 
Oil Creek Family Campground in Oil Creek State Park
Benson Memorial Library
Burgess Park Splash Pad

Festivals 

 OilFest- Festival in Titusville largest day time festival in Pennsylvania
 Home for the Holidays- Christmas Activities in December in Titusville
 Heart of the Arts folk and music festival
 Titusville Summer Concert Series

Education 
The area is served by the Titusville Area School District which includes Titusville High School, Titusville Middle School, Mainstreet Elementary. Pleasantville Elementary, Hydetown Elementary, ECLC.

Universities 

 University of Pittsburgh at Titusville
 Northern Pennsylvania Regional College

Notable people
Joseph Bushnell Ames (1878–1928), novelist
Peter Ashmun Ames (1888–1920), British Army intelligence officer
William Henry Andrews (1846–1919), politician
J. J. Bleday (b. 1997), baseball player signed to Miami Marlins; attended Titusville High School
Julien Bryan (1899–1974), photographer, filmmaker, and documentarian during World War II
Axtell J. Byles (1880–1941), football player and coach
Shane Callahan, film and television actor
Edwin L. Drake (1819–1880), first man to discover oil; discovered in Titusville
Ralph Dunn (1900–1968), actor and filmmaker
Thomas Griffin (1857–1933), MLB player
William Draper Harkins (1873–1951) chemist, notable for his contributions to nuclear chemistry
Ray Harroun (1879–1968), race car driver; first Indianapolis 500 winner
Thomas Hazzard (1871–1957), football player and Christian minister
John Heisman (1869–1936), player and coach of football, baseball, and basketball, as well as a sportswriter and actor
Helen Jepson (1904–1997), opera singer
Paul S. L. Johnson (1873–1950), scholar and pastor, founder of the Laymen's Home Missionary Movement
Harry Jordan ( 1873–1920), Major League Baseball pitcher for the Pittsburgh Pirates
R. A. Mihailoff, actor and wrestler
David N. Ott (1937–2020), Maine state representative and lawyer
John E. Peterson (b. 1938), congressman
Dane Rauschenberg (b. 1976), endurance athlete
Rocky Reynolds, professional wrestler; former four-time NWA World Junior Heavyweight Champion
Jeannie Seely (b. 1940), Grand Ole Opry Star
John Washington Steele (1843–1920), flamboyant oilman, first millionaire from oil
Ida Tarbell (1857–1944), teacher, journalist
Ray Tesser (1912–1982), NFL player
Francis Thompson, film director
A. Leo Weil (1858–1938), lawyer

In popular culture 
 American rapper Afroman says, "Did a show that night in Titusville/Afro is the tightest and that's for real" in the song "Pimpin Pennsylvania".
 American singer, songwriter, musician, and actor Johnny Cash mentioned the story of Titusville and performed a song about it on the Johnny Cash Show in 1970.

See also 
Oil Region

References

External links

 
 City of Titusville official website

 
Cities in Pennsylvania
Populated places established in 1796
Cities in Crawford County, Pennsylvania
1796 establishments in Pennsylvania